SportsNation may refer to:
 SportsNation (website), an interactive sports debate and polling site on ESPN.com
 SportsNation (TV series), a daily ESPN2 television series
 SB Nation, short for "Sports Blog Nation", a website and YouTube channel managed by Vox Media

ESPN